Yardley is an area in east Birmingham, England. It is also a council constituency, managed by its own district committee. Historically it lay within Worcestershire.

Birmingham Yardley is a constituency and its Member of Parliament is Jess Phillips, elected in May 2015.

The area of Gilbertstone straddles the border of Yardley and South Yardley.

Features

Yardley's main shopping area is known as Yew Tree, named after the yew that stood, originally to the south of the roundabout, outside what was then Boots, then on the roundabout at the junction in the centre of Yardley. It was damaged during work to the roundabout, and as a result was removed. It was later replaced by another tree located in the centre of the island.

In 2012, the Swan Shopping Centre was opened in the area serving the Yardley area in the place of the old Swan Centre which used to hold markets.

History

Parish of Yardley
Yardley is not a town. The ancient parish of Yardley included the areas known as Stechford and Hall Green. Yardley is named in the Domesday Book and was referred to as early as 972 in King Edgar's Charter where it is named Gyrdleah. It was mentioned as being under the possession of Pershore Abbey.
Yardley also contains a moated medieval site called "Kent's Moat". Now dry, it has retained its depth and shape remarkably well considering its age, as excavations have shown evidence of inhabitation from as early as the 12th century.

Yardley has a Tudor hall called Blakesley Hall and an old church, St Edburgha's, that dates back to the 13th century, with the church tower and spire dating to the 15th century. It was not established by the abbey, but by Aston Church in the Diocese of Lichfield. A Tudor addition to the church is a doorway surrounded by Tudor roses and a pomegranate, commemorating the marriage of Prince Arthur, Prince of Wales, to Catherine of Aragon.

Yardley had a manor that was owned by various lords. It remained unoccupied from 1700 onwards. It was owned by the Royal Family until 1626, when it was bought by Richard Grevis of Moseley Hall. His descendants sold it in 1759 to pay off debts. John Taylor, one of the founders of Lloyds Bank, bought the lordship in 1766. Most of the land, had by then, been purchased by other people so Taylor owned only a small portion of the original grounds.

Yardley Rural District

Yardley Rural District was a local government administrative district formed from the parish of Yardley, historically part of Worcestershire under the Local Government Act 1894. The Rural District included the wards of Yardley Wood. Yardley Council House was originally erected to house the Rural District Council (Yardley RDC). 

By 1911 Yardley was a residential suburb of Birmingham and was annexed to Birmingham and Warwickshire under the 1911 Greater Birmingham Act.  Birmingham's Worcestershire heritage can be seen at Acocks Green police station where the building is decorated with a "three pears" motif from the Worcestershire coat of arms.

A small section of Yardley, called Old Yardley, was granted conservation area status in 1969, becoming Birmingham's first conservation area.

In 1981, an Arcon V prefab home on Moat Lane was dismantled and transported to Avoncroft Museum of Historic Buildings.

Education

Yardley has five main primary schools. These are Yardley, Blakesley Hall, Lyndon Green, Oasis Academy Hobmoor and St. Bernedettes. It also has two main secondary schools, which are Cockshut Hill School and King Edward VI Sheldon Heath Academy.

Hobmoor Primary School moved to new premises in Summer 2007. The former building has been demolished and the site remains vacant to be redeveloped.

Transport
Yardley's nearest railway station is Stechford railway station. It is served by National Express West Midlands bus routes 11A, 11C, 17, 58, 60, 73, X1 and X2, connecting to Birmingham city centre, outer circle, Chelmsley Wood and Solihull and Claribel Coaches route S16.

The area used to be well-served by horse-buses and then by steam buses. Electric trams were then introduced and they travelled across a new bridge at the River Cole to the Swan.

References

Bibliography

External links

 Birmingham City Council: Yardley Constituency
 History of Yardley
 1888 Ordnance Survey map of Yardley
 

Areas of Birmingham, West Midlands
Conservation areas in England